The 1893–94 season was Aston Villa's 6th season in the Football League since its formation. They finished the season as champions for the first time, and for the next few years they would be very much the dominant side of English football, winning a total of five championships and two FA Cups by 1900.

For the first two of these championship seasons, they were based at Wellington Road. Though reporters claimed gates of 20,000, it is not clear how many of these would have been able to see the game!

Villa built up a six-point lead by the end of December and maintained that margin to the end of the season, with only Sunderland providing a serious challenge.

Jack Devey was an all-round sportsman who enjoyed a long cricket career with Warwickshire. He played football for local clubs in Birmingham before joining Villa in 1891. He was capped twice by England.

Jimmy Cowan was an attacking centre-half in the days when this was a common tactic. He was well known as a sprinter and won the Powderhall Handicap in 1896. He was just 5 ft 6 in (1.69 m) tall, but his quoted weight of 12 st 3 lbs (77.6 kg) indicates a sprinter’s powerful build.

First Division 

Aston Villa won the league title in the final match of the season 3-1 against Everton with goals from top scorer Guy Jones.

FA Cup
Ever-present: Jimmy Cowan

First at top: 16 September

Players used: 23

External links
AVFC History 1893–94 season

1893-94
1894
English football clubs 1893–94 season